KTOE (1420 AM) is a radio station licensed to Mankato, Minnesota and serving the Mankato area and the Minnesota River Valley. The 1420 AM frequency went on the air in 1950, airing a news/talk format. The station simulcasts via two FM translators on 98.7 FM and 102.7 FM, both licensed to Mankato.

The station is operated by Linder Radio Group a.k.a. Subarctic Medial LLC.

KTOE aired a full service AC format during the 1980s and was once an affiliate of American Top 40.

External links
KTOE

 
 

Radio stations in Minnesota
Mankato, Minnesota
Radio stations established in 1950